Andrei Strâmbeanu (25 August 1934 – 5 August 2021) was a Moldovan writer and politician. He served as a member of the Parliament of Moldova (1998–2001).

References

External links

 Andrei Strâmbeanu. Vinovat în proporţie de 90 la sută
 Cine au fost şi ce fac deputaţii primului Parlament din R. Moldova (1990-1994)?
 Declaraţia deputaţilor din primul Parlament
 Site-ul Parlamentului Republicii Moldova

1934 births
2021 deaths
20th-century Moldovan historians
Moldovan male writers
Popular Front of Moldova politicians
Moldovan MPs 1998–2001
Recipients of the Order of the Republic (Moldova)
People from Edineț District